Umar Kakumba, is a Ugandan  management consultant,  academic and academic administrator who, since 15 November 2018, serves as the Deputy Vice Chancellor for Academic Affairs at Makerere University, Uganda's oldest and largest public university.

Background and education
He was born in Uganda in the 1970s. After attending local primary and secondary schools, he was admitted to Makerere University, graduating with a Bachelor of Arts degree in Social Sciences. He followed that with a Diploma in Business Administration and a Masters in Public Administration & Management, all from Makerere University.

His Doctor of Philosophy in Public Affairs degree was awarded by the University of Pretoria in South Africa. In 2014, he completed a post-doctoral fellowship at Wolfson College, Cambridge, in the United Kingdom.

Work experience
Dr Kakumba has spent most of his academic career at the School of Business, in the College of Business and Management (CoBAMS), of Makerere University. At the time he was appointed Deputy Vice Chancellor, he had risen to the rank of Associate Professor and Dean of the school of business.

See also
 John Ddumba Ssentamu
 William Bazeyo
 Sylvia Tamale

References

External links
MAK Search Committee Declares Prof Bazeyo, Dr. Kakumba Winners of DVC Race As of 15 November 2018.

Living people
1970s births
Academic staff of Makerere University
Makerere University alumni
University of Pretoria alumni
Alumni of the University of Cambridge